Kangto (also known as Kanggardo Rize) at  is a mountain of the Eastern Himalayas located in the Indian state of Arunachal Pradesh and it shares its border with the Tibet Autonomous Region of China. It is the highest point in Arunachal Pradesh. The area in which Kangto is located lies in the Lada circle of East Kameng district of the state. On the Chinese side, it lies in Cona County of Shannan Prefecture, Tibet.

It is a virgin peak. Mount Kangto is the source of the Pachuk river, one of the main tributaries of the Kameng river in East Kameng district. 

A joint expedition team of ITBP and Indian Mountaineering Foundation had established a base camp at 9,920 feet on the banks of Pachuk river on October 21, 2017. All earlier attempts to reach the base of the peak were unsuccessful.

See also

 List of Ultras of the Himalayas
 Chiumo

References

External links
 "Kangtö, China" on Peakbagger

Mountains of Tibet
Seven-thousanders of the Himalayas
Mountains of Arunachal Pradesh
Highest points of Indian states and union territories